Estancia Municipal School District, or Estancia Municipal Schools, is a school district headquartered in Estancia, New Mexico.

The district includes Estancia, Tajique, Torreon, Willard, and a portion of McIntosh. It also includes the unincorporated areas of Chilili and Lucy.

History
In 2000 Estancia High was placed on the New Mexico list of strongly improving schools.

Joel Shirley served as superintendent until July 2019, when Cindy Sims took his position.

Schools
 Estancia High School (grades 9-12)
 Estancia Middle School (7-8)
 Upper Elementary School (4-6)
 Lower Elementary School (1-3)
 Van Stone Elementary School (preschool and kindergarten)
 Estancia Valley Learning Center (what the district refers to as "life skills" students)

References

External links
 
School districts in New Mexico
Torrance County, New Mexico